Night Song is an album by guitarist Kenny Burrell recorded in 1968 and 1969 and released on the Verve Records label.

Track listing 
 "Night Song" (Lee Adams, Charles Strouse) – 3:26
 "Blues for Wes" (Kenny Burrell) – 4:21
 "Namely You" (Gene de Paul, Johnny Mercer) – 3:38
 "Love You Madly" (Duke Ellington) – 4:06
 "Just A-Sittin' and A-Rockin'" (Ellington, Lee Gaines, Billy Strayhorn) – 3:58
 "The Shadow of Your Smile" (Johnny Mandel, Paul Francis Webster) – 5:10
 "Brother Where Are You Now" (Oscar Brown) – 2:48
 "Night Hawk" (Burrell) – 8:07
 "Teach Me Tonight" (Sammy Cahn, de Paul) – 4:03

Personnel 
Kenny Burrell - guitar
Bernie Glow (tracks 1 & 4), Joe Shepley (tracks 1 & 4), Marvin Stamm (tracks 1, 4, 7 & 9) - trumpet
Wayne Andre (tracks 1 & 4), Jimmy Cleveland (tracks 1 & 4), Urbie Green (tracks 1 & 4), Alan Raph (tracks 1, 4, 7 & 9), J. J. Johnson (tracks 7 & 9), Tom Mitchell (tracks 7 & 9), Jay Sherman (tracks 7 & 9) - trombone
Don Butterfield (tracks 1 & 4) - tuba
Jerome Richardson (tracks 1 & 4), Phil Bodner (tracks 7 & 9) - flute, piccolo
Warren Bernhardt (tracks 1 & 4), Hank Jones (tracks 7 & 9), Richard Wyands (tracks 2, 3, 6 & 8) - piano
Ron Carter - bass
Donald McDonald (tracks 1 & 4), Billy Cobham (tracks 7 & 9), Freddie Waits (tracks 2, 3, 6 & 8) - drums
Johnny Pacheco (tracks 1 & 4), Jack Jennings (tracks 7 & 9) - percussion
Don Sebesky - arranger (tracks 1, 4, 7 & 9)

References 

Kenny Burrell albums
1969 albums
Verve Records albums
Albums produced by Esmond Edwards
Albums arranged by Don Sebesky